Snežana Pajkić-Jolović (born September 23, 1970 in Ćuprija, SR Serbia, Yugoslavia) is a former middle distance runner from Serbia. She won the gold medal for Yugoslavia in the women's 1500 metres at the 1990 European Athletics Championships in a Yugoslav record. Pajkić represented her country at the 1991 World Championships in Athletics. She also took a silver medal in the 800 metres at the Mediterranean Games.

She was a two-time 1500 m champion at the European Athletics Junior Championships and was twice a medallist in that event at the IAAF World Junior Championships in Athletics.

International competitions

Personal bests
800 metres: 2:01.78 (1991) 
1500 metres: 4:08.12 (1990) 
3000 metres: 9:07.44 (1986)

See also
 Serbian records in athletics

References

 Interview
 Atletska legenda Snežana Pajkić Jolović (eng. Athletic legend Snežana Pajkić Jolović) ----article from: Serbian Athletic Association website

1970 births
Living people
People from Ćuprija
Serbian female middle-distance runners
Yugoslav female middle-distance runners
Serbia and Montenegro athletes
Serbia and Montenegro sportswomen
World Athletics Championships athletes for Yugoslavia
European Athletics Championships medalists
Mediterranean Games silver medalists for Yugoslavia
Athletes (track and field) at the 1987 Mediterranean Games
Mediterranean Games medalists in athletics